The Northern Ireland women's national under-17 football team represents Northern Ireland in international youth football competitions and is controlled by the Northern Ireland Women's Football Association (NIWFA), the women's football arm of the Irish Football Association (IFA) and the governing body for women's football in Northern Ireland.

FIFA U-17 World Cup 
The team has never qualified.

UEFA Under-17 Championship 
The Northern Ireland U17 team took part in the qualification for the UEFA Under-17 Championship in 2008 and has consistently participated since 2011. The team has never qualified.

Current squad 
The following players were named in the squad for the 2023 UEFA Under-17 Championship qualification.

See also 

 Northern Ireland women's national football team
 Northern Ireland women's national under-19 football team

References 

Northern Ireland women's national football team
Women's national under-17 association football teams
European women's national under-17 association football teams